DAF/DOS was an electronic music project formed by Gabriel "Gabi" Delgado-López in 1995 as a continuation of his work with Deutsch Amerikanische Freundschaft (D.A.F.) (the 'DOS' in the band name refers to the Spanish word for 'two').

History 
Gabi recorded the album 'Allein, zu zweit, mit Telefon' with Wotan Wilke Möhring (who started an acting career a few years later), and then went solo for the 1999 album 'Der DAF/DOS Staat' (a live recording of this project was also released around the same time). The original D.A.F. lineup would reform a few years later, and the 'DOS' incarnation of 'D.A.F.' has not been heard from since.

Discography

Albums 
 Allein, zu zweit, mit Telefon (1996)
 Der DAF/DOS Staat (1999)
 Der DAF/DOS Live Staat (1999)

Singles 
 Ich glaub' ich fick' dich später (1996)
 Stimme des Herzens (1996)
 Nordisc EP (1997)
 International Song (1999)

References 
 http://www.discogs.com/artist/DAF+%2F+DOS
 http://www.last.fm/music/DAF%252FDOS

German electronic music groups